New Berlin is a village in Sangamon County, Illinois, United States. The population was 1,346 at the 2010 census, and 1,327 at a 2018 estimate. It is part of the Springfield Metropolitan Statistical Area. New Berlin is home to CUSD #16, New Berlin High School.

Geography
New Berlin is located at  (39.725206, -89.911992).

Demographics

As of the census of 2000, there were 1,030 people, 428 households, and 296 families residing in the village. The racial makeup of the village was 98.35% White, 0.39% African American, 0.19% Native American, 0.68% from other races, and 0.39% from two or more races. Hispanic or Latino of any race were 0.68% of the population.

There were 428 households, out of which 32.7% had children under the age of 18 living with them, 58.4% were married couples living together, 8.2% had a female householder with no husband present, and 30.8% were non-families. 28.5% of all households were made up of individuals, and 11.9% had someone living alone who was 65 years of age or older. The average household size was 2.41 and the average family size was 2.94.

In the village, the population was spread out, with 25.3% under the age of 18, 7.1% from 18 to 24, 31.6% from 25 to 44, 21.5% from 45 to 64, and 14.6% who were 65 years of age or older. The median age was 36 years. For every 100 females, there were 90.7 males. For every 100 females age 18 and over, there were 90.3 males.

The median income for a household in the village was $41,635, and the median income for a family was $50,139. Males had a median income of $35,417 versus $22,614 for females. The per capita income for the village was $19,313. About 4.0% of families and 5.8% of the population were below the poverty line, including 8.5% of those under age 18 and 7.6% of those age 65 or over.

History
The Potawatomi Trail of Death passed through here in 1838.

The village was founded in 1865 by a community of mostly German immigrants. Only a very few buildings from the original village still remain on the town's main thoroughfare, old Illinois State Route 54.

Culture
The village is the site of the annual Sangamon County Fair, which is typically held on the days leading up to the third weekend in June.

Sites of interest 

 New Berlin Area Veterans Memorial - Dedicated July 6, 2013.
 Sangamon County Fairgrounds
 Danenberger Family Vineyards

References

Villages in Sangamon County, Illinois
Villages in Illinois
Springfield metropolitan area, Illinois
Populated places established in 1865
German-American history